Sudden Fear is a 1952 American film noir thriller film directed by David Miller, and starring Joan Crawford and Jack Palance in a tale about a successful woman who marries a murderous man.  The screenplay by Lenore J. Coffee and Robert Smith was based upon the novel of the same name by Edna Sherry.

Plot
Myra Hudson (Crawford) is a successful Broadway playwright who rejects Lester Blaine (Palance) as the lead in her new play.  Later, she meets Lester on a train bound for San Francisco, is swept off her feet and, after a brief courtship, marries him.

Lester is unaware that Myra is making changes to her will which will ensure he would inherit everything. She has begun dictating these alterations into her personal dictating machine but is interrupted when guests begin to arrive for the evening. She forgets to turn the machine off and, later, when Lester and his long-time lover, Irene Neves (Gloria Grahame), are in Myra's study, they find the original will which stipulates that the bulk of her fortune be left to a foundation. Irene suggests Myra's murder and, unknown to the couple, their subsequent plotting is recorded.

Myra discovers their plans and concocts a scheme of her own, to kill Lester and place the blame on Irene, but the complex timing—so she herself is assured an  alibi—starts to unravel. Lester learns of Myra's intentions and, after life-and-death shifts in everybody's murderous aims, ultimately ends up chasing her in his car through the streets of San Francisco. On foot, Myra is able to avoid him, and eventually Lester mistakes Irene for Myra (they are dressed alike). He aims the car at the woman. Myra, seeing this at the last minute, shouts to stop him but it is too late. Lester crashes, killing both himself and Irene. Myra breathes a sigh of relief as she walks safely off into the night.

Cast
 Joan Crawford as Myra Hudson
 Jack Palance as Lester Blaine
 Gloria Grahame as Irene Neves
 Bruce Bennett  as Steve Kearney
 Virginia Huston as Ann Taylor
 Mike Connors (billed as Touch Conners) as Junior Kearney

Reception

Critical response
When the film was released, the film critic for The New York Times, A. H. Weiler, reviewed the film favorably: "Joan Crawford should be credited with a truly professional performance in Sudden Fear ... The entire production has been mounted in excellent taste and, it must be pointed out, that San Francisco and Los Angeles, Bunker Hill area, in which most of the action takes place, is an excitingly photogenic area. David Miller, the director, has taken full advantage of the city's steep streets and panoramic views. And, in his climactic scenes in a darkened apartment and a chase through its precipitous dark alleys and backyards he has managed to project an authentically doom-filled atmosphere."

Otis L. Guernsey Jr., also wrote a positive review in the New York Herald Tribune.  He wrote: "The scenario...is designed to allow Miss Crawford a wide range of quivering reactions to vicious events, as she passes through the stage of starry-eyed love, terrible disillusionment, fear, hatred, and finally hysteria.  With her wide eyes and forceful bearing, she is the woman for the job."

Village Voice reviewer Melissa Anderson wrote in 2016 that Sudden Fear "fits into and defies different genres, its convention-scrambling partly the result of the fact that the film looks both forward and back." Dennis Schwartz liked the film, but questioned some of the film's plot points, saying that "David Miller stylishly directs this disturbing psychological gargoyle thriller ... [Yet] ... the suspense is marred by plot devices that don't hold up to further scrutiny. Joan Crawford has a chance to act out on her hysteria after her happy marriage is unmasked as a charade, and does a fine job of trying to remain calm while knowing her hubby and [his] girlfriend are planning to kill her ... The film is grandly topped off by Charles B. Lang Jr. and his remarkably glossy black-and-white photography."

Crawford received her third and final Oscar nomination for this film, the only time she competed against arch-rival Bette Davis for Best Actress, who was nominated (for the tenth time) for The Star.  Neither actress won; Shirley Booth took home the prize for Come Back, Little Sheba.

Noir analysis
In 1984, film noir historian Spencer Selby noted, "Undoubtedly one of the most stylish and refined woman-in-distress noirs."

Accolades

Home media
Sudden Fear was first released on VHS by Kino Video. Kino also released the film on Region 1 DVD in 2003. In 2006, the film was also released as part of Film Noir - The Dark Side of Hollywood DVD box set by Kino Video. In 2016, the film was released on Blu-ray by Cohen Film Collection.

References

External links
 
 
 
 
 
 Sudden Fear at Reel SF - Movie locations with "then and now" images

1952 films
1950s thriller films
American thriller films
American black-and-white films
1950s English-language films
RKO Pictures films
Film noir
Films scored by Elmer Bernstein
Films based on American novels
Films based on thriller novels
Films directed by David Miller
Films set in San Francisco
Films shot in New York City
Films shot in San Francisco
1950s American films